Frangula rubra (syn. Rhamnus rubra) is a species of flowering plant in the buckthorn family known by the common names red buckthorn and Sierra coffeeberry.

Distribution
It is native to the mountains and plateau areas of northern and eastern California and western Nevada, including the Sierra Nevada and Klamath Mountains, where it grows in many habitat types, including forests, chaparral, and sagebrush.

Description

Frangula rubra is a spreading shrub approaching two meters in maximum height, its bark red or gray. The thin, deciduous leaves are generally oval in shape, green to grayish in color, and up to 8 centimeters long. The edges are smooth or faintly toothed. The inflorescence is an umbel of up to 15 flowers with five pointed sepals opening into a starlike shape and five smaller, greenish petals. The fruit is a drupe which ripens to black. It measures just over a centimeter long and contains 2 seeds.

External links
Jepson Manual Treatment - Rhamnus rubra
USDA Plants Profile: Frangula rubra
Rhamnus rubra - Photo gallery

rubra
Flora of California
Flora of Nevada
Flora of Oregon
Natural history of the California chaparral and woodlands
Flora of the Cascade Range
Flora of the Great Basin
Flora of the Klamath Mountains
Flora of the Sierra Nevada (United States)
Taxa named by Edward Lee Greene
Plants described in 1887
Flora without expected TNC conservation status